Lee Cheuk-yan (born 12 February 1957 in Shanghai) is a Hong Kong politician and social activist. He was a member of the Legislative Council of Hong Kong from 1995 to 2016, when he lost his seat. He represented the Kowloon West and the Manufacturing constituencies briefly in 1995 and had been representing the New Territories West constituency from 1998 to 2016. He is a trade union leader and General Secretary of the Hong Kong Confederation of Trade Unions, as well as former chairman of the Hong Kong Alliance in Support of Patriotic Democratic Movements of China.

Background
Lee's ancestral home is Chaoyang, Guangdong. Lee emigrated from Mainland China to Hong Kong in 1959. He graduated from the University of Hong Kong with a bachelor's degree in civil engineering in 1978. Since his university days, he has been a labour and pro-democracy activist.

During the student-led Tiananmen Square protests of 1989, he collected donations from the Concert for Democracy in China in Hong Kong and travelled to Beijing to hand over the funds to student protesters in Tiananmen Square. He was detained by the authorities there and made to sign a confession letter before being allowed to return to Hong Kong. Since the events of 1989, Lee has remained a standing committee member of the Hong Kong Alliance in Support of Patriotic Democratic Movements of China which promotes democratic reform in China.

Legislative Councillor
In 1995, Lee was elected unopposed in a by-election of the Legislative Council, replacing Lau Chin-shek, who had resigned. He has since been re-elected four times, continuously serving as a lawmaker, except for a brief period during 1997 and 1998, when the sovereignty of Hong Kong was transferred to the People's Republic of China, and the Legislative Council temporarily became a Provisional Legislative Council, composed of Beijing nominees.

Labour Party
In December 2011, he and three other Legislative Councillors Fernando Cheung, Cyd Ho and Cheung Kwok-che co-founded the Labour Party, which became the third largest pan-democratic party in the legislature. He served as chairman until December 2015 when he stepped down to give way to the younger party members and took the vice-chairmanship.

He received an unexpected loss in the 2016 Legislative Council election, departing the legislature after more than 20 years of service.

Family
He is married to Elizabeth Tang, who in 2005 was the chairperson of the Hong Kong People's Alliance on WTO, and who  is the general secretary of the International Domestic Workers Federation. They have one daughter.

Arrests
On 28 February 2020, Lee was arrested for his involvement in a pro-democracy march on 31 August 2019, which was part of the protests sparked by the extradition bill and had been classified by police as illegal assembly. A few hours later, he was released on bail, as were the other arrestees Jimmy Lai and Yeung Sum. The cases were scheduled to be heard at Eastern Law Court on 5 May 2020. 

On 18 April, Lee was one of the 15 Hong Kong high-profile democracy figures arrested on suspicion of organizing, publicizing or taking part in several unauthorized assemblies between August and October 2019 during the anti-extradition bill protests. On 1 April 2021, Lee was convicted, along with six other pro-democracy advocates, for his role in a rally on 18 August 2019. On 16 April, Lee was sentenced to 14 months in jail for his role in this and another August 2019 rally.

See also
 List of graduates of University of Hong Kong

References

External links
Hong Kong Legislative Council's website on Hon Lee Cheuk-yan
Hong Kong Confederation of Trade Unions' election campaign website

1957 births
Alumni of the University of Hong Kong
Alumni of St. John's College, University of Hong Kong
Hong Kong Confederation of Trade Unions
Living people
Hong Kong social democrats
Hong Kong trade unionists
Hong Kong Christians
Charter 08 signatories
The Frontier (Hong Kong) politicians
Labour Party (Hong Kong) politicians
Politicians from Shanghai
HK LegCo Members 1991–1995
HK LegCo Members 1995–1997
HK LegCo Members 1998–2000
HK LegCo Members 2000–2004
HK LegCo Members 2004–2008
HK LegCo Members 2008–2012
HK LegCo Members 2012–2016
Hong Kong political prisoners